William Cummings may refer to:

 William Cummings (Australian politician) (1803–1878), New South Wales politician
 William Hayman Cummings (1831–1915), English musician
 Candy Cummings (William Arthur Cummings, 1848–1924), U.S. baseball player
 William Cummings (athlete) (1858–1919), Scottish athlete
 William Cummings (rugby union) (1889–1955), New Zealand rugby union player
 William Thomas Cummings (1903–1945), Maryknoll mission priest and U.S. military chaplain

See also
Bill Cummings (disambiguation)
 William Cumming (disambiguation)